Michael Longley,  (born 27 July 1939, Belfast, Northern Ireland), is an Anglo-Irish poet.

Life and career
One of twin boys, Michael Longley was born in Belfast, Northern Ireland, to English parents, Longley was educated at the Royal Belfast Academical Institution, and subsequently read Classics at Trinity College, Dublin, where he edited Icarus. He was the Ireland Professor of Poetry from 2007 to 2010, a cross-border academic post set up in 1998, previously held by John Montague, Nuala Ní Dhomhnaill, and Paul Durcan. He was succeeded in 2010 by Harry Clifton. North American editions of Longley's work are published by Wake Forest University Press.

Over 50 years he has spent much time in Carrigskeewaun, County Mayo, which has inspired much of his poetry.

His wife, Edna, is a critic on modern Irish and British poetry. They have three children. Their daughter is artist Sarah Longley. An atheist, Longley describes himself as a "sentimental" disbeliever.

On 14 January 2014, he participated in the BBC Radio 3 series The Essay – Letters to a Young Poet. Taking Rainer Maria Rilke's classic text Letters to a Young Poet as inspiration, leading poets wrote a letter to a protege. Longley has provided readings of his poetry for the Irish Poetry Reading Archive (UCD).

His twin brother, Peter, died in 2013/14. Longley dedicated the second half of The Stairwell (2014), his tenth collection, to him.

Awards and honours
Gorse Fires (1991) won the Whitbread Poetry Prize. The Weather in Japan (2000) won the T.S. Eliot Prize and the Hawthornden Prize.  It also brought him the inaugural Yakamochi Medal in 2018. He holds honorary doctorates from Queen's University Belfast (1995) and Trinity College, Dublin (1999) and was the 2001 recipient of the Queen's Gold Medal for Poetry. Longley was appointed Commander of the Order of the British Empire (CBE) in the 2010 Birthday Honours.

Longley won a 2011 London Awards for Art and Performance. His collection A Hundred Doors won the Poetry Now Award in September 2012.

His 2014 collection, The Stairwell, won the 2015 International Griffin Poetry Prize. In 2015, he received the Ulster Tatler Lifetime Achievement Award. He was awarded the PEN Pinter Prize in 2017. The Chair of the judges, Don Paterson, said: "For decades now his effortlessly lyric and fluent poetry has been wholly suffused with the qualities of humanity, humility and compassion, never shying away from the moral complexity that comes from seeing both sides of an argument."

In 2015 Longley was elected a Freeman of the City of Belfast. In 2018, he was made an honorary fellow of Trinity College Dublin.

List of works

 Ten Poems (1965), Belfast: Festival Publications
 Secret Marriages: Nine Short Poems (1968), Manchester: Phoenix Press
 No Continuing City (1969), London: Macmillan: New York: Dufour Editions
 Lares (1972) Woodford Green, London: Poet & Printer
 An Exploded View (1973), London: Victor Gollancz
 Fishing in the Sky: Love Poems (1975), London: Poet & Printer
 Man Lying on a Wall (1976), London: Victor Gollancz; (1977) New York: Transatlantic Arts 
 The Echo Gate (1979) London: Seeker & Warburg; Mew York: Random House
 Selected Poems 1963–1980 (1981), Winston-Salem, USA: Wake Forest University Press
 Patchwork (1981), Dublin: The Gallery Press
 Poems 1963–1983 (1985), Edinburgh: The Salamander Press; Dublin: The Gallery Press; (1987) Winston-Salem, USA: Wake Forest University Press, 
 Gorse Fires (1991), London: Seeker & Warburg; Winston-Salem, USA: Wake Forest University Press 
 Baucis and Philemon: After Ovid (1993), London: Poet & Printer
 Birds and Flowers: Poems (1994), Edinburgh: Morning Star
 Tuppeny Stung: Autobiographical Chapters (1994), Belfast: Lagan Press
 The Ghost Orchid (1995), London: Jonathan Cape; (1996) Winston-Salem, USA: Wake Forest University Press
 Ship of the Wind (1997), Dublin: Poetry Ireland
 Broken Dishes (1998), Newry, N. Ireland: Abbey Press
 Selected Poems (1998), London: Jonathan Cape; (1999) Winston-Salem, USA: Wake Forest University Press 
 Out of the Cold (1999), Newry, N. Ireland: Abbey Press
 The Weather in Japan (2000), London: Jonathan Cape; Winston-Salem, USA: Wake Forest University Press 
  Cenotaph of Snow: Sixty Poems About War (2003), London: Enitharmon Press
 Snow Water (2004), London: Jonathan Cape; Winston-Salem, USA: Wake Forest University Press
 The Rope-Makers (2005), London: Enitharmon Press
 Collected Poems (2006), London: Jonathan Cape; (2007), Winston-Salem, USA: Wake Forest University Press
 A Jovial Hullabaloo (2008), London: Enitharmon Press
 A Hundred Doors (2011), London: Jonathan Cape; Winston-Salem, USA: Wake Forest University Press
 The Stairwell (2014), London: Jonathan Cape; Winston-Salem, USA: Wake Forest University Press
 One Wide Expanse (2015), Dublin: University College Dublin Press
 Sea Asters (2015), published by Andrew J Moorhouse – Rochdale, UK: Fine Press Poetry
 The Dipper's Range (2016), published by Andrew J Moorhouse – Rochdale, UK: Fine Press Poetry
 Twelve Poems (2016), Thame, Oxford: Clutag Press
 Angel Hill (2017), London: Jonathan Cape; Winston-Salem, USA: Wake Forest University Press
 Sidelines: Selected Prose (2017), London: Enitharmon Press
 Ghetto (2019), published by Andrew J Moorhouse – Rochdale, UK: Fine Press Poetry
 The Candlelight Master (2020), London: Jonathan Cape; Winston-Salem, USA: Wake Forest University Press
 Homer's Octopus (2020), published by Andrew J Moorhouse – Rochdale, UK: Fine Press Poetry
 Metamorphoses (2022), published by Andrew J Moorhouse – Rochdale, UK: Fine Press Poetry

See also

 List of Northern Irish writers

References

Further reading
 Allen, Michael, ed. Options: The Poetry of Michael Longley, Éire-Ireland 10.4 (1975): pp. 129–35.
 Allen Randolph, Jody. "Michael Longley, February 2010". Close to the Next Moment: Interviews from a Changing Ireland. Manchester: Carcanet, 2010.
 Allen Randolph, Jody and Douglas Archibald, eds. Special Issue on Michael Longley. Colby Quarterly 39.3 (September 2003).
 Brearton, Fran. Reading Michael Longley. Bloodaxe, 2006.
 Clyde, Tom, ed. Special Issue on Michael Longley. Honest Ulsterman 110 (Summer 2001).
 Peacock, Alan J. and Kathleen Devine, eds. The Poetry of Michael Longley: Ulster Editions and Monographs 10. Gerrards Cross, Buckinghamshire, England: Colin Smythe, 2000.
 Robertson, Robin, ed. Love Poet, Carpenter: Michael Longley at Seventy. London: Enitharmon Press, 2009.
 Russell, Richard Rankin. Poetry and Peace: Michael Longley, Seamus Heaney, and Northern Ireland. South Bend, IN: University of Notre Dame Press, 2010.

External links

  (contains a "Critical Perspective" section)
 Video readings in the Irish Poetry Reading Archive, UCD Digital Library, University College Dublin 
 
 Wake Forest University Press North American publisher of Longley
 Portraits at the National Portrait Gallery 
 Poetry archive profile and poems written and audio
 Ulster Museum portrait
 Audio interview by Krista Tippett
 Stuart A. Rose Manuscript, Archives, and Rare Book Library, Emory University: Michael Longley papers, 1960-2000

1939 births
20th-century writers from Northern Ireland
21st-century writers from Northern Ireland
Male writers from Northern Ireland
Living people
Alumni of Trinity College Dublin
Aosdána members
Christopher Ewart-Biggs Memorial Prize recipients
Costa Book Award winners
Commanders of the Order of the British Empire
Fellows of the Royal Society of Literature
Honorary Fellows of Trinity College Dublin
Male poets from Northern Ireland
Writers from Belfast
20th-century poets from Northern Ireland
21st-century British poets
21st-century British male writers
20th-century British male writers
21st-century poets from Northern Ireland
T. S. Eliot Prize winners